Franck Jacques Rolling (born 23 August 1968 in Colmar) is a French former football defender.

Rolling began his career as an attacking player at RC Strasbourg, making his debut in a game against Sporting Club Toulon on 15 October 1988. However Rolling did not manage to carve out a regular first team place and so dropped down a division in 1992 to join Pau FC. He moved to Scotland with Ayr United F.C. in 1994 and was spotted there by Leicester City F.C. who brought him to England the following year for a fee of £100,000. Rolling found it hard to get a spot in the Foxes first team, particularly after their promotion to the Premier League. He departed Filbert Street in 1997 to join AFC Bournemouth and made something of a name for himself at the club by scoring two goals in the two-leg Associate Members' Cup Southern Final, booking the club a place at the Wembley showpiece.  He was an unused substitute for the final (1-2 defeat vs. Grimsby), after which his relationship with the manager had irretrievably broken down.

After his release from Bournemouth, Rolling was briefly on the books of Gillingham F.C. and Wycombe Wanderers F.C., before leaving England to try his luck with SK Vorwärts Steyr of Austria (who went into bankruptcy during the season) and Veria F.C. of Greece. He returned to France in 2001 to play for Jura Sud Lavans, retiring the following year.

References

External links
 
 Stats on RC Strasbourg unofficial site

1968 births
French footballers
RC Strasbourg Alsace players
Ligue 1 players
Ligue 2 players
AFC Bournemouth players
Ayr United F.C. players
Association football defenders
Gillingham F.C. players
Leicester City F.C. players
Living people
French people of German descent
Premier League players
Wycombe Wanderers F.C. players
Veria F.C. players
Expatriate footballers in England
Expatriate footballers in Greece
French expatriate footballers
Pau FC players
Jura Sud Foot players
Scottish Football League players
Expatriate footballers in Scotland
English Football League players